Stand Out is the third album by American gospel music artist Tye Tribbett and the final album to feature his choir Greater Anointing (G.A.) before the choir was retired in 2009. The album is the group's second live recording. The album was recorded at a live concert on August 17, 2007 at the Rock Church International, Virginia Beach, Virginia and released on May 6, 2008.

Background
In an interview before the live recording of Stand Out, Tye Tribbett, leader, writer and producer of the group, stated that the whole message behind the album and tour is Ephesians 6:11. The album is the second live album released by Tye Tribbett & G.A., the first being 2006's Victory Live.

Guest appearances
Jon Owens on "Bless the Lord (Son of Man)".
Tribbett revisits the album Victory Live by expanding the interlude "Look Up" into a full-length song with Angela White and Kierra "Kiki" Sheard joining him on lead vocals.
Kim Burrell on "He Has Made Me Glad".

Track listing

Charts

References

2008 live albums